The 1871 Minnesota gubernatorial election was held on November 7, 1871 to elect the governor of Minnesota. Incumbent Horace Austin was reelected to a second term.

Results

References

1871
Minnesota
gubernatorial
November 1871 events